The Iron Horse Regional Trail is a rail trail for pedestrians, horse riders and bicycles in the East Bay Area in California.

This trail is located in inland central Alameda and  Contra Costa counties, mostly following a Southern Pacific Railroad right of way established in 1891 and abandoned in 1977.  The two counties purchased the right of way at that time, intending to use it as a transportation corridor; the Iron Horse Trail was first established in 1986. In 2003, BART proposed to also use the right-of-way for a DMU line from Walnut Creek station to Tracy via Pleasanton.

The trail passes through the cities of Pleasanton, Dublin, San Ramon, Danville, Alamo, Walnut Creek, Pleasant Hill and Concord. When completed, the trail will span from Livermore in central Alameda County to Suisun Bay at the northern edge of Contra Costa County, a distance of over  connecting two counties and nine communities. The trail also directly connects to both the Dublin/Pleasanton and Pleasant Hill BART stations.

The trail is maintained by the East Bay Regional Park District. It is a wheelchair accessible paved trail along with adjacent unpaved or soft trails in certain areas.

The Iron Horse Regional Trail has several bridges over busy thoroughfares to help improve traffic flow; two notable ones cross over Ygnacio Valley Road in Walnut Creek and Treat Boulevard in Contra Costa Centre. Additional bridges are in the planning process.

Despite initial skepticism, and even opposition, the trail is now a major transportation and recreation corridor.
One million trips are made each year on the path.

Pleasanton/Alameda County segments

The city of Pleasanton initially chose not to preserve the transportation corridor within its city limits. Although the East Bay Regional Park District (EBRPD) still controlled the right of way, multiple developments were built encompassing the corridor, most notably Hacienda Business Park.

In February 2011, the Pleasanton City Council voted to ratify the EBRPD master plan, based on public meetings held the previous year, to complete the trail within the city. $4 million in regional and federal grants was allocated to complete the BART-to-Santa Rita section of the trail. Construction began in May 2013, and was completed in July 2014. The project accommodated several obstacles, including routing through an existing business campus, two city parks, a residential development, an apartment complex, and three at-grade crossings of busy roads; it connects with the earlier southern segment at the intersection of two major streets.

In April 2013, another new trail segment opened along Stanley Boulevard on the north side of Shadow Cliffs Lake in unincorporated Alameda County. This leaves a  gap between the end of the Pleasanton portion of the trail and the west end of this new segment. The East Pleasanton Specific Plan Project includes plans to complete this gap along future extensions to Busch Road and El Charro Road to Stanley Boulevard.

A 2022 project extended this segment from the Livermore city limits at the intersection of Stanley Boulevard and Isabel Avenue with a trail paralleling Stanley Avenue on its north side to a new bridge over Murrieta Boulevard; the trail dead-ends about  past the bridge.

References

External links
 Iron Horse Regional Trail - East Bay Regional Park 
 Iron Horse Regional Trail Page on RailsToTrails.us
 Nearby Hiking Trails in Contra Costa County - Walnut Creek Wiki

East Bay Regional Park District
Rail trails in California
Trails in the San Francisco Bay Area
Bike paths in the San Francisco Bay Area
Parks in Alameda County, California
Parks in Contra Costa County, California
Transportation in Alameda County, California
Transportation in Contra Costa County, California
Concord, California
Danville, California
Dublin, California
Amador Valley
Livermore Valley

Pleasant Hill, California
Geography of Pleasanton, California
San Ramon, California
Walnut Creek, California
Protected areas established in 1986
1986 establishments in California